Maria Theresa Bland (1769–1838) was a British singer who enjoyed high popularity in the London theatre during the last decade of the 18th century and the first two decades of the 19th century.

Life
Maria Bland, the daughter of Italian Jews, was born with the surname of Romanzini. The year of her birth is assumed to be historically correct, but as was common in the 18th century, the day and month went unrecorded.

Her parents came to London soon after their daughter's birth, and in the spring of 1773, through the influence of a hairdresser named Cady, obtained an engagement for their child at Hughes's Riding School. 
Her vocal talent developed at a very early age, and after singing at the Royal Circus she was engaged by Richard Daly for the Dublin Theatre, where she sang with great success. 
In 1782, on the retirement of Mary Ann Wrighten, she was engaged at Drury Lane Theatre to take her parts, which were those known as 'singing chambermaids.' 
Miss Romanzini's first appearance at Drury Lane took place on 24 October 1786, when she played Antonio in an English version of Grétry's Richard Coeur-de-lion. In 1789 she went to Liverpool, and sang there with such success, both on the stage and at concerts, that she refused to return to Drury Lane unless her salary were raised. 
The management declining to grant her request, after waiting a few weeks, she came back to London and resumed her place at Drury Lane. 
Mrs. Bland remained attached to the Drury Lane company for the greater part of her life, but she also sang at the Haymarket Theatre under Colman's management, where her first appearance took place in 1791, as Wowski in Arnold's Inkle and Yarico. She also sang for several seasons at Vauxhall Gardens. 
In 1824, she began to exhibit symptoms of imbecility, which developed into a kind of melancholy.

On 5 July 1824 a performance was given for her benefit at Drury Lane, which produced (together with a public subscription) about £800. 
The money was handed over to Lord Egremont, who allowed her an annuity of £80. 
She lived for the rest of her life with a family named Western, at the Broadway, Westminster, where she died of a fit of apoplexy on 15 January 1838. She was buried at St. Margaret's, Westminster, on 25 January.

Critical assessment
Mrs. Bland's voice was a mezzo-soprano of very sweet quality. 
Her powers were limited, but as a singer of English ballads she was singularly perfect and free from any blemish of style or taste. 
In person she was short and dark, but her acting was very bright and vivacious.

The following is a list of the principal engraved portraits of her: 1, in the 'Thespian Magazine,' vol. i., by J. Condé (publisher 23 June 1795); 2, as Miss Notable in the 'Lady's Last Stake,' by De Wilde (published 23 June 1795); 3, as Nina in the 'Prisoner' (published 1 Feb. 1796); 4 and 5, as Mary Ann in the 'School for Guardians,' by Graham (published 21 Jan. 1796); 6, 'The Bland Melodist' (coloured) (published 12 March 1805); 7, as Madelon in the 'Surrender of Calais' (n.d.).

Family
On 21 October 1790 she married George Bland, a minor actor and a brother of Dorothea Jordan. Her husband, whom it was said that she had treated badly, left her and went to America, where he died in 1807. She lived for more than a decade with the English actor Thomas Caulfield before he also left for America.

Mrs. Bland had had two sons: Charles, a tenor singer, who was the original Oberon in Weber's opera, and James, a bass, who began life as an opera singer, but later better known as an actor of burlesque, and who died at the Strand Theatre on 17 July 1861.

References

Attribution
 Endnotes: 
Ann. Register, lxxx. 197 ; 
Georgian Era, iv. 297; 
Genet's Hist. of the Stage vi. 424 ix. 240; 
Musical World. 19 and 26 Jan. 1838; 
Thespian Magazine, 1. 298; 
Gent. Mag. 1790, 956; 
Kelly's Reminiscences, ii. 80 ; 
information from William Henry Husk.

External links
 
 https://anthonyjcamp.com/pages/anthony-j-camp-ancestry-0f-mrs-jordan

British musical theatre actresses
British women singers
British Jews
Jewish classical musicians
1769 births
1838 deaths
Place of birth unknown
Date of death unknown
Place of death unknown
Date of birth unknown